Three Bridges, properly known as Windmill Bridge, is a three-level crossing of bridges near Hanwell in west London, England. Designed by Isambard Kingdom Brunel, the bridges are arranged to allow the routes of the Grand Junction Canal, Great Western and Brentford Railway, and Windmill Lane to cross each other, with the road above the canal and above the railway. This allowed the railway to be in a deep cutting so it wasn't visible from Osterley Park. Work began in 1856, and was completed in 1859. The project was Brunel's last to be finished before he died on 15 September 1859.

The structure is a scheduled monument.

See also

List of canal aqueducts in Great Britain

References

Scheduled monuments in London
Navigable aqueducts in England
Bridges by Isambard Kingdom Brunel